Cagwait, officially the Municipality of Cagwait (Surigaonon: Lungsod nan Cagwait), is a 4th class municipality in the province of Surigao del Sur, Philippines. According to the 2020 census, it has a population of 21,747 people.

Geography

Cagwait is politically subdivided into 11 barangays.

It is bounded by the towns of Bayabas on the north, Marihatag on the south, the Diwata mountains on the west and the Pacific Ocean in the east.

Barangays
Aras-asan
Bacolod
Bitaugan East
Bitaugan West
La Purisima (Palhe)
Lactudan
Mat-e
Poblacion
Tawagan
Tubo-tubo
Unidad

Climate

Cagwait has a tropical rainforest climate (Af) with heavy to very heavy rainfall year-round and with extremely heavy rainfall in January.

Demographics

Economy

Cagwait has an all-weather port at Barangay Bitaugan West (named Aras-asan Port by the Philippine Ports Authority) secured by the natural protection of Arangasa Islands. It has also an abandoned aerodrome made and used by the private planes of Aras-asan Timber Company, Inc. (ARTIMCO) during its peak of timber operation in the late 1970s.

Barangay Poblacion is the seat of governance, while the center of trade of the municipality is in Barangay Aras-asan. It houses three rural banks, two pawnshops, three bakeshops, a radio station, a public terminal and public market. Telecommunication is on par with other neighboring municipalities using cell phones, and Internet via GPRS, and cable television are available. There are also good tourist inns, beach resorts and homestay (bread and breakfast). Motorized tricycles, jeepneys, and buses ply its roads and concrete highways.

Cagwait was the home of the now defunct company ARTIMCO, Inc., one of the largest suppliers of timber in the country. Its land holdings became a sanctuary of the Philippine Eagle. Its land holdings became a sanctuary of the Philippine Eagle which was discovered by Charles Lindbergh during his wildlife expedition. He also discovered the beautiful white-sand beach cove of Cagwait which he described as similar to Waikiki Beach in Hawaii.

Cagwait beach is the venue for the popular annual Kaliguan festival. Normally held towards the end of June, the festival is held over three days. A temporary stage is constructed on the beach and features music and a beauty pageant known as Perlas Ng Kaliguan. The most recent festival held in June 2019 was the 23rd annual Kaliguan festival.

Notable personalities

Elmar Sillador – 1992 Philippine National Police Medal of Valor recipient

References

External links

Cagwait Profile at PhilAtlas.com
 Cagwait Profile at the DTI Cities and Municipalities Competitive Index
[ Philippine Standard Geographic Code]
Philippine Census Information
Local Governance Performance Management System
Cagwait Community LGU

Municipalities of Surigao del Sur